Onekama is the name of a village and a township in Manistee County, in the U.S. state of Michigan:

 Onekama, Michigan
 Onekama Township, Michigan